James Brien (born February 4, 1848 in Howard Township, Canada West-died August 10, 1907) was a politician and physician. He was elected to the House of Commons of Canada in the 1887 election as a Member of the Liberal Party to represent the riding of Essex South. After his federal political career, he became mayor of Essex Centre, Ontario in 1895 for a term of eight years where he also served as a reeve and a councillor for three years. His cousin, John Wesley Brien, was also a Member of the Canadian House of Commons.

External links
 

1848 births
1907 deaths
Liberal Party of Canada MPs
Members of the House of Commons of Canada from Ontario
Place of death missing